The North American Vascular Biology Organization is a scientific society promoting knowledge exchange in the area of vascular biology. The society organises several international scientific meetings annually which broadly cover the areas of development of blood and lymphatic vasculature, cardiovascular and lymphatic disease, vascular matrix biology and vascular bioengineering.

History 
The North American Vascular Biology Organization was founded in 1994 as a non-profit scientific organization with voluntary membership.

Membership 
The North American Vascular Biology Organization is open to those with an interest in the subject of vascular biology who wish to engage with members to promote the study and dissemination of scientific information relevant to vascular biology, and who meets the criteria established by the Council, which is elected by the Membership.

Council Leadership (2021-2022) 
President

Griffin, Courtney T.

Oklahoma Medical Research Foundation

President-elect

Hughes, Christopher C.

University of California, Irvine

Immediate Past President

Aikawa, Masanori

Brigham and Women's Hospital

Secretary-Treasurer

Muller, Bill A.

Northwestern University Feinberg School of Medicine

Councilors

Boscolo, Elisa

Cincinnati Children's Hospital Medical Center

Glading, Angela J.

University of Rochester

Gomez, Delphine

University of Pittsburgh

Greif, Daniel M.

Yale University School of Medicine

Shapiro, Linda H.

University of Connecticut Health Center

St. Hilaire, Cynthia

University of Pittsburgh

Past Presidents 
Masanori Aikawa (2020-2021)

Brigham & Women's Hospital, Harvard Medical School

Ondine Cleaver (2019-2020)

UT Southwestern Medical Center

Michelle Bendeck (2018-2019)

University of Toronto

Cecilia Giachelli (2017-2018)

University of Washington

Jan Kitajewski (2016-2017)

University of Illinois at Chicago

Joyce Bischoff (2015-2016)

Boston Children's Hospital

Karen Hirschi (2014-2015)

University of Virginia

Klaus Ley (2013-2014)

La Jolla Institute for Immunology

Victoria Bautch (2012-2013)

University of North Carolina at Chapel Hill

Tim Hla (2011-2012)

Boston Children's Hospital

William Sessa (2010-2011)

Pfizer, Inc.

Brant Weinstein (2009-2010)

NICHD/NIH

Mark Majesky (2008-2009)

University of Washington

Mark Ginsberg (2007-2008)

University of California, San Diego

Luisa Iruela-Arispe (2006-2007)

Northwestern University

Michael Simons (2005-2006)

Yale School of Medicine

William Muller (2004-2005)

Northwestern University

Linda Demer (2003-2004)

University of California, Los Angeles

Paul DiCorleto (2002-2003)

Retired

Alexander Clowes* (2001-2002)

University of Washington

Mary E. Gerritsen (2000-2001)

Gerritsen Consulting

Bradford Berk (1999-2000)

University of Rochester Medical Center

Gary Owens (1998-1999)

University of Virginia

Jordan Pober (1997-1998)

Yale School of Medicine

Elizabeth Nabel (1996-1997)

ModeX Therapeutics

Stephen Schwartz* (1995-1996)

University of Washington

Michael Gimbrone (1994-1995)

Brigham & Women's Hospital, Harvard Medical School

*Deceased

Awards and honours 
The society administers offers travel awards to trainee members and three annual awards to independent vascular biology investigators, the Springer Junior Investigator Award for a junior researcher who presents outstanding work for presentation at a society meeting that year, the Judah Folkman Award in Vascular Biology for a mid-career researcher who has made significant contributions to vascular biology research, and the Earl P. Benditt Award for an established researcher who has contributed seminal work to vascular biology research.

Springer Junior Investigator Award

 2011 - Carlos Fernandez-Hernando, New York University, USA
 2012 - Lorin E. Olson, Oklahoma Medical Research Foundation, USA
 2013 - Hyung J. Chun, Yale University, USA 
 2014 - Jason E. Fish, University of Toronto, USA
 2015 - Daniel Greif, Yale University, USA
 2016 - Stefania Nicoli, Yale University, USA
 2017 - Babak Razani, Washington University in St. Louis, USA
 2018 - Yi Fan, University of Pennsylvania, USA
 2019 - Bhama Ramkhelawon, New York University, USA 
 2020 - Zhen Chen, City of Hope, USA
 2021 - Ying Yang, University of South Florida, USA

Judah Folkman Award

 2009 - Luisa Iruela-Arispe, UCLA, USA
 2010 - Brant Weinstein, NICHD/NIH, USA
 2011 - Holger Gerhardt, Cancer Research UK, United Kingdom
 2012 - Cam Patterson, UNC, USA
 2013 - Mark Kahn, University of Pennsylvania, USA
 2014 - Tatiana Byzova, Cleveland Clinic, USA
 2015 - Mukesh Jain, Case Western Reserve University, USA
 2016 - Gabriele Bergers, University of Leuven, Belgium
 2017 - Guillermo García-Cardeña, Harvard Medical School
 2018 - Christiana Ruhrberg, UCL, United Kingdom
 2019 - Anne Eichmann, Yale University, USA
 2020 - Kristy Red-Horse, Stanford University, USA
 2021- Carlos Fernández-Hernando, Yale University, USA
 2022 - Stefania Nicoli, Yale University, USA

Earl P. Benditt Award

 1999 - Morris Karnovsky
 2000 - Judah Folkman
 2001 - Stephen Schwartz
 2002 - Michael A. Gimbrone, Jr.
 2003 - Mark H. Ginsberg
 2004 - Peter Carmeliet
 2005 - Thomas Maciag
 2006 - Salvador Moncada
 2007 - Harold F. Dvorak
 2008 - Shaun R. Coughlin
 2009 - A. Jake Lusis
 2010 - Richard O. Hynes
 2011 - Kari Alitalo
 2012 - Bradford C. Berk
 2013 - Michael Klagsbrun
 2014 - Jordan S. Pober
 2015 - Eli Keshet
 2016 - Elisabetta Dejana
 2017 - Peter Libby
 2018 - Rakesh Jain
 2019 - Bill Sessa
 2020 - Patricia D'Amore
 2021 - Guillermo Oliver
 2022 - Joyce E Bischoff

References

External links 

Scientific organizations based in the United States